16 teams participated in the 1996–97 Egyptian Premier League season. The first team in the league was the champion, and qualified to CAF Champions League, while the runner up qualified to the CAF Cup. The season started on 20 August 1996 and concluded on 25 August 1997.
Al Ahly managed to win the league for the 26th time in the club's history.

League table

Top goalscorers

References

1996–97 in African association football leagues
0
Premier